Vive la colo ! is a French television series. It ran from 2012 to 2013 on TF1 (France).

Plot 
Morgane Kemener is back in the camp of Spray, because her father Victor was hospitalized and he cannot direct it at the moment. Although the housekeeper, Capucine helped by Monitors; Driss, Edgar, Thiphaine and Loïc, do everything to contain these lovely darlings, there reigns chaos! Morgan then agreed to lead the camp for a week.

Cast
 Virginie Hocq : Morgane Kemener (Season 1&2)
 Titoff : Loïc (Season 1&2)
 Jean-Louis Foulquier : Victor Kemener (Season 1&2)
 Julien Boisselier : Thomas Bonifaci (Season 1&2)

Season 1
 Charlotte de Turckheim : Capucine Kabik
 Raphaël Lenglet : Driss
 Mhamed Arezki : Edgar
 Ophélie Bazillou : Tiphaine
 Nicolas Woirion : Manu
 Andréa Ferréol : Yvonne

Season 2
 Guilaine Londez : Capucine Kabik
 Catherine Jacob : Rosalie
 Luce : Luna
 Grégory Montel : Boris
 Côme Levin : Hugo
 Augustin Bonhomme : Jimmy
 Mathieu Delarive : Stéphane (Episodes 2-3)

Ratings

References

External links

 Vive la colo! on Allociné

2012 French television series debuts
TF1 original programming